Restless Soul may refer to:

 Restless Soul (album), an album by The Proclaimers
 Restless Soul (artist/label), British DJ and music producer Phil Asher, and a UK record label run by Asher
 Restless Souls (1919 film), a 1919 American drama film directed by William C. Dowlan
 Restless Souls (1922 film), a 1922 American drama film directed by Robert Ensminger